The  is a professional golf tournament on the Japan Golf Tour. Founded in 1981, it is played in November and is one of the richest tournaments in Japan, attracting some of the leading international golfers. It was held at the Ibusuki Golf Club, Kaimon Course in Ibusuki, Kagoshima from 1981 to 2004. In 2005, it moved to the Kochi Kuroshio Country Club in Geisei, Kōchi.

The event is organized by Casio, Kuroshio Kanko Kaihatsu and TV Kochi.

Winners

Notes

External links
Coverage on the Japan Golf Tour's official site
Official site 

Japan Golf Tour events
Golf tournaments in Japan
Sport in Kagoshima Prefecture
Sport in Kōchi Prefecture
Recurring sporting events established in 1981
Casio